Michel Bakhoum (1913–1981) was an Egyptian  consulting civil engineer, university professor, and a researcher in concrete structures.

Education and early years
Michel Bakhoum was born in June 1913 in Cairo.

He graduated from the Civil Engineering Department at Cairo University in 1936 (then known as Fouad I University). He completed his M.Sc. in 1942, and his first Ph.D. in 1945. He was the second person in Egypt to receive a Ph.D. from the Faculty of Engineering at Cairo University. In 1945, he traveled to the University of Illinois at Urbana-Champaign where he received his second Ph.D. He then spent one year at Columbia University in New York, to strengthen his background in Theoretical Mechanics, Theory of Elasticity and Theory of Plasticity. He worked also (part time) in a Consulting Engineering Firm at the same time in New York City, to get acquainted with State-of-the-Art design methodologies of Concrete Structures in the USA.

Consulting engineering
In 1949, Michel Bakhoum returned to Egypt where he started teaching in the Structural Engineering Department at Cairo University as an assistant professor. He started a consulting firm in 1950 with his colleague Ahmed Moharram. The company is now known as ACE: Arab Consulting Engineers (Moharram-Bakhoum). The company started as a structural-design office with four people in 1950, now the company has over eight-hundred staff working with the consulting firm ACE.

Academic career
Michel Bakhoum taught civil and structural engineering students  for about forty years, mainly at Cairo University, but also at Ain Shams and Assiut Universities. He was a teaching assistant from 1937 to 1945, and then as assistant professor and professor from 1949 to 1981.

Societies
Michel Bakhoum was a fellow and member in several technical societies — Fellow of the Institution of Structural Engineers (UK), and representative in Egypt from 1972 to 1979; Fellow of the American Society of Civil Engineers; Member of the American Concrete Institute; and Member of the International Association for Bridges and Structural Engineering and various other engineering and academic bodies.

Awards
He received three official awards from the President of Egypt for his designs of Cairo Stadium, Cairo Airport, and Cairo International Fair Ground Buildings (including several Prestressed Concrete Shells), in 1960, 1963, and 1964 respectively. He received an award for designing these prestressed shells in 1966 from the FIP (International federation for Prestressed Concrete).  

1960 Egyptian Republic Award (3rd Level) ( وسام الجمهورية - الطبقة الثالثة ) ;  1963 Award for Science and Arts (1st Degree) ( وسام العلوم والفنون - الطبقة الاولى);  1964 Award for Trade and Industry (1st Degree) ( وسام التجارة والصناعة - الطبقة الاولى)

Prof. Michel Bakhoum died on 21 April 1981. The next day, the daily Egyptian newspaper Al-Ahram published a front page news article about him, citing that he had died, and summarized his main works.  Al-Ahram is the main newspaper in Egypt, established in 1876, with about one million copies printed daily. News in the first page of Al-Ahram about people who have died, is only kept for the most notable in Egypt. In addition, a street in the Dokki District (in Giza - Greater Cairo) where he lived was named after him, Dr. Michel Bakhoum Street. This is considered an honor bestowed to very few people in Egypt. An article about Prof. Dr. Eng. Michel Bakhoum appears in the "Dictionary of Distinguished Egyptians in the 20th Century" published by the Middle East News Agency in 1998. Also, an article in the Book entitled " History of the Coptic Church, Volume 8: 20th Century".

See also
List of prominent Copts
 Michel Bakhoum: Pioneer of the Built Infrastructure of Africa’s Most Populous Nation, By Seif El Rashidi, Great Achievements, Structure Magazine, USA, April, 2014, http://www.structuremag.org/wp-content/uploads/D-GreatAch-Rashidi-Apr141.pdf
 Watani Newspaper, Cairo, Egypt, June 2013: https://www.wataninet.com/2013/06/%D9%85%D9%8A%D8%B4%D9%8A%D9%84-%D8%A8%D8%A7%D8%AE%D9%88%D9%85-%D9%81%D9%89-%D9%85%D8%A6%D9%88%D9%8A%D8%A9-%D9%85%D9%8A%D9%84%D8%A7%D8%AF%D9%87-%D8%B9%D8%A7%D8%B4%D9%82-%D8%A7%D9%84%D9%85%D8%A8%D8%A7/
 Saint Mark's Coptic Orthodox Cathedral:  https://en.wikipedia.org/wiki/Saint_Mark%27s_Coptic_Orthodox_Cathedral
 6th October Bridge:  https://en.wikipedia.org/wiki/6th_October_Bridge

1913 births
1981 deaths
Cairo University alumni
University of Illinois Urbana-Champaign alumni
Columbia School of Engineering and Applied Science alumni
20th-century Egyptian engineers
Egyptian people of Coptic descent
Egyptian civil engineers
Academic staff of Cairo University
Academic staff of Ain Shams University
Academic staff of Assiut University